Marrum is a village in Noardeast-Fryslân municipality in the province of Friesland, the Netherlands. It had a population of around 1,462 in January 2017. Before 2019, the village was part of the Ferwerderadiel municipality.

2006 horse rescue operation
In 2006 following a storm nearly 100 horses were stranded on a small mud island. Eventually they were rescued after seven women equestrians organised by Norma Miedema through an internet forum rode out through the water and then rode back leading the horses to safety (Susan Fransen riding Blizzard, Micky Nijboer riding Berber, Antje Dijkstra riding Humphrey, Hinke Lap riding Guinever, Christina Stormer riding Perfeft and Fardow de Rueter riding King). A memorial was subsequently erected to mark the bravery and ingenuity of these women.

Windmills
There are two windmills in Marrum, De Grote Molen and De Phenix. A third mill, De Kleilânsmole was dismantled in 2010 for restoration and rebuilding at Ferwert.

References

External links

 website  about Marrum

Noardeast-Fryslân
Populated places in Friesland